Transcontinental rail corridors (Australia) may refer to either of the following:

East–west rail corridor (Australia), which redirects to Sydney–Perth rail corridor
North–south rail corridor (Australia), which redirects to Adelaide–Darwin rail corridor.